Serdar is a surname of the following notable people:
Can Serdar (born 1996), German-Turkish football midfielder
Emerîkê Serdar (1935–2018), Kurdish-Yezidi writer from Armenia
Iva Serdar (born 1982), Croatian basketball player
 Ivo Serdar (1933–1985), Croatian actor
Lenka Serdar (born 1997), Czech-American ice hockey player
Ovezmurat Dykma-Serdar (1825–1882), Turkmen tribal leader
Suat Serdar (born 1997), German football midfielder